The Secrétariat du Québec aux relations canadiennes (SQRC), formerly known as the Secrétariat aux affaires intergouvernementales canadiennes (SAIC), is an agency of the government of Quebec. Its stated purpose as of 2010 is to "[advise] the Government of Québec on all Canadian intergovernmental matters, [coordinate] Québec government activities in Canada, [assure] the defence and promotion of Québec’s interests, and [collaborate] to strengthen links with Canada’s francophone and Acadian communities."

The secretariat is overseen by the minister responsible for Canadian Relations. Most ministers who have held this position since 2005 have also been styled as the minister responsible for Francophone Canadians. The current minister is Jean-Marc Fournier.

Benoît Pelletier, who was minister from 2003 to 2008, was also styled as the minister responsible for the Agreement on Internal Trade from March 17, 2005, to April 18, 2007. This title was not used by his successors.

References

Quebec government departments and agencies